The 1970 Maryland Terrapins football team represented the University of Maryland in the 1970 NCAA University Division football season. In their second season under head coach Roy Lester, the Terrapins compiled a 2–9 record (2–4 in conference), finished in seventh place in the Atlantic Coast Conference, and were outscored by their opponents 241 to 112. The team's statistical leaders included Jeff Shugars with 836 passing yards, Art Seymore with 945 rushing yards and 309 receiving yards.

Schedule

Roster

References

Maryland
Maryland Terrapins football seasons
Maryland Terrapins football